Frank Naleway (July 5, 1902 – January 28, 1949) nicknamed "Chick", was a Major League Baseball player for the Chicago White Sox in . He played in just one game for the White Sox at shortstop, going 0-for-2 at the plate with one walk.

Sources

External links 

 Frank Naleway at SABR (Baseball BioProject)

Major League Baseball shortstops
Chicago White Sox players
Sioux Falls Soos players
Kalamazoo Kazoos players
London Tecumsehs (baseball) players
Burlington Bees players
1902 births
1949 deaths
Baseball players from Chicago